Koreshk or Kareshk or Kereshk may refer to:
 Kareshk, Kerman (كرشك - Kareshk)
 Kareshk, Razavi Khorasan (كرشك - Kareshk)
 Koreshk, South Khorasan (كرشك - Koreshk)
 Kareshk, South Khorasan (كارشك - Kāreshk)